"Heartbeatz" is a song performed by UK duo Styles & Breeze featuring Karen Danzig. It became the duo's second top-20 hit in Finland and the United Kingdom.

Chart performance
In Finland, the song debuted at number 16 but only spent one week in the top 20. In Ireland, it debuted at number 38 and spent one week in the top 50. On the UK Singles Chart, it debuted at number 16, then dropped to number 36 the following week, number 51 on its third week, then number 68 on its final week on the chart.

Music video
The music video features Styles & Breeze DJing against a flashy black background, and Karen lying on a red heart-shaped bed and alternating scenes of her with other dancers, dressed in "sexy nurse" outfits.

Charts

References

External links
 Heartbeatz music video link

2005 songs
2005 singles
Styles & Breeze songs
All Around the World Productions singles
Songs written by Darren Styles